Albeck may refer to:

Albeck (surname)
Albeck, Carinthia, a town in Austria